Second Hand is an album by Mark Heard, released in 1991, on Heard's own Fingerprint Records. The album was listed at No. 4 in the book CCM Presents: The 100 Greatest Albums in Christian Music.

At the 4th Annual Americana Music Association Honors & Awards at the Ryman Auditorium in September 2005, Buddy Miller received the Album of the Year Award for his Universal United House of Prayer, and the opening track of that album, a cover of Heard's "Worry Too Much" (originally released on this album), won the Song of the Year Award.

Track listing
All songs written by Mark Heard, except where otherwise noted.
 "Nod Over Coffee" – 4:38
 "Lonely Moon" – 4:54
 "Worry Too Much" – 4:13
 "Look Over Your Shoulder" – 3:29
 "She Don't Have a Clue" – 3:47
 "Talking in Circles" – 4:05
 "Love Is Not the Only Thing" – 4:58
 "I Just Wanna Get Warm" – 3:53
 "Another Good Lie" – 5:39
 "All Too Soon" – 3:57
 "It's Not Your Fault" – 3:23
 "I'm Looking Through You" (John Lennon, Paul McCartney) – 3:40
 "What Kind of a Friend" – 2:42
 "The Ways of Men" (Steve Padgett) – 5:09

Personnel 
The band
 Steve Hindalong – drums
 David Raven – drums
 Bill Batstone – acoustic bass guitar, electric bass guitar
 Glen Holmen – standup bass, electric bass guitar
 Fergus Jemison Marsh – Chapman stick
 Mark Heard – acoustic and electric guitars, Hammond organ, vocals, accordion, mandolin, harmonica
 Pam Dwinell-Miner – backing vocals
 Greg Leisz – pedal steel guitar, dobro
 David Baker – percussion
 Doug Atwell – fiddle

Production notes
 Mark Heard – producer, engineer, mixing at Fingerprint Recorders, artwork, packaging
 Neverland Studios – drum recording location
 Dan Russell – production associate
 Chuck Long – executive producer
 Joel Russell – Face photography
 Eddy Schreyer – digital mastering at Future Disc Systems

Notes

1991 albums
Mark Heard albums